Nadia Mapunda (born 26 October 1988) is an Australian netball player. In 2008, she played for the Adelaide Thunderbirds in the ANZ Championship.

References
2008 Adelaide Thunderbirds profile. Retrieved on 2008-07-15.

1988 births
Living people
Adelaide Thunderbirds players
ANZ Championship players
Australian netball players
Netball players from South Australia